was a Japanese rock band signed to Epic Records.

Overview
Futoshi and OKP-Star met on with9.com in 2000 and attempted to start a band together. Unable to agree on the band's future, the two disbanded. In 2003, the current band members gathered and formed Aqua Timez. Their first independent music mini album, Sora Ippai ni Kanaderu Inori, was released in August 2005. In 2006, the group were signed to Epic Records Japan and released their second mini album, Nanairo no Rakugaki. In the same year they released two singles, "Ketsui no Asa ni" and "Sen no Yoru o Koete", which were used as the theme music in the animated films Brave Story and Bleach: Memories of Nobody respectively. Their music in the films help garnered attention and later they recorded their first full-length studio album Kaze o Atsumete.

As of December 2016, they have released a total of 2 mini albums, 19 singles, 8 albums, and a single compilation album.

In May 2018, the band announced their break up, following their final concert tour "Present is a Present tour 2018".

Discography

Singles

Albums

Compilation album

References

External links
  

Japanese alternative rock groups
Japanese pop rock music groups
Sony Music Entertainment Japan artists
Musical groups established in 2003
Musical groups disestablished in 2018